A list of films produced in the United Kingdom in 1969 (see 1969 in film):

1969

See also
1969 in British music
1969 in British radio
1969 in British television
1969 in the United Kingdom

References

External links

1969
Films
British